Yoko is a 3D animated adventure children's education television series that released in 2015. The target audience is preschool. The first season contains 52 episodes. Spanish companies Somuga based in Andoain and  based in Irún with RTVE along with Wizart Animation from Russia were the animation studios who produced the animated series. Yoko is the first Russian-Spanish animated co-production in the history of animation. The story is written by Juanjo Elordi,  Edorta Barruetabeña, P. Kevin Strader and Andy Yerkes. Yoko features a multilingual adaptation of the magical adventures of the character Yoko (translated from Basque – "spirit of the game"). Juanjo Elordi and Rishat Gilmetdinov directed the episodes. The idea was conceptualized by Juanjo Elordi from the Basque Country.

The series is intended for children from 4–6 years old (12 minutes and 52 episodes per season) with educational content for the preschool social curriculum. Originally produced in the languages of Spanish, Russian, English and Basque; the first season aired on 13 November 2015 within the primary regions of Russia and Spain. During 2017 and 2018, Jetpack Distributions began a series of distribution agreements across the markets of Europe. Currently the series reruns are broadcast in TV platforms such as Clan, CTC and RTVE.

The series follows three children who unexpectedly meet the spirit of the game, Yoko. Together they revive the game and opens incredible world of childhood. Yoko adds magic to children's games and turns fantasy into reality. With the help of Yoko; Oto, Vik, Mai, and Ranger Loops pass difficult and entertaining tests that are featured in landscapes such as space, the raging sea, the fairy forest, and ancient cities. The series facilitates engagement with the outside world emphasizing ways children can play outside. Reed MIDEM, a MIP organizer has twice awarded the TV series with the title, "Animated Series with Highest International Potential."

Plot 
The story follows the adventures of Mai, Oto and Vik and a magical creature named Yoko. Yoko has been developed as a truly international property focused on outdoor play patterns with a social curriculum that mixes friendship, nature, and imagination. Yoko is a magical forest creature who only appears to those children who play with no holds barred. The main characters simply love to play outside. The enthusiasm and energy with which they throw themselves headlong into their games arouses the curiosity of a magical being Yoko who takes ordinary children's games and turns them into extraordinary adventures. Thanks to Yoko's magic, games such as "tag", for example, can suddenly become an exciting rocket race in outer space. Adventures are featured in various settings that cross different continents.

Characters 
Yoko - Yoko is the most friendly magical creature. He is a yellow giant with bunny ears. His species once occupied the parkland before buildings and people closed it in. Yoko has a unique way of communication. He emotes, gestures and uses the word "Yoko" a thousand different ways. But somehow Oto, Vik, and Mai understand everything. Yoko is quite old by human years, but young in Yoko years. He has emotional and social maturity of a child. Yoko is all about good time but he is unpredictable, emotional and contrary. Most of the time Yoko simply acts and plays like one of gang. Abuelita or Granny states, "Yoko only appears to children who love to play." Yoko uses magic to maximize or minimize existing conditions and objects. He also can make a cloud rain in one spot, freeze a lake, or make the sun shine.

Vik - Vik, 6 years-old, is the most reasonable of the bunch. The smartest and most erudite boy among the friends, Vik has a clearer idea of the rules of a game, although he has trouble catching on when things change. But, once Vik gets the gist he is a skilled role player who really gets into details. He has brown hair, brown eyes, and tan skin. Dependable Vik is everyone's best friend. He seeks peace and equanimity for others and for his own sanity. Vik is the one to say "time out!"

Mai - 4 year-old Mai is very sweet at heart. Mai is the only female in the company of kids. She loves everything about natural world of the park: flowers, trees. She has long, spiky, hot pink hip-length hair, green eyes and fair skin. She wears a yellow-orange medium-sleeved shirt with white short around the hem of the sleeves and the white short collar, a white short stripe along the bottom/on it, a green skirt, white short socks and darker pine-green sneakers. Mai is very verbal. She considers herself to be an expert about a lot of things. Mai likes to be prepared and is never far from her four-wheeled pull cart.

Oto - Oto is an impulsive 5-year-old. The most perky, naughty, and active among the friends; Oto likes everything connected with sports, rivalry, and active rest. He has blue hair, blue eyes, and fair-reddish skin. Physical Oto was made for outdoor play. He loves digging, climbing, skidding and earth foraging. But nothing dampens his enthusiasm for long. When the play begins, his creative ideas form exiting roles for everybody and scenarios that keep on giving. Oto's the last one to say "It's time to go home."

Ranger Loops - Ranger Loops is a park ranger who is the main woman in the park. She keeps the peace and order in City Park. She is enthusiastic and loves leading the kids in flower-sniffing exercises and wild animal calls. She is also a banjo player who sings short musical ditties about park rules and obscure nature facts. She looks after the park and enjoys chatting with children. Working out of the park recreation house, Ranger Loops dispenses sports gear, costumes, and art materials to the kids.

Cast

Production

Television Debut 
The original idea was created by Juanjo Elordi the director from the Basque Country whose animated film credits including Olentzero: A Christmas Carol. The concept was formalized in 2011 after realizing a children's project based on outdoor play was fitting for the time period they were living in. The concept was rarely explored in the Basque region television channels. The support of projects related to children's television content during the timer period was lacking. Elordi would create a network of animation studios from Spain who started work on animated series about the benefits of outdoor play and the interaction of urban environments and children, all conceptualized by the eponymous character Yoko. Writer Edorta Barruetabeña from Spain wrote the script while Wizart Animation would provide additional support in animation. The project became the first Russian-Spanish series in the history of animated co-production.

In terms of animation, Alexey Medvedev stated one of the unique parts of the characters is how unusually organized their limbs are because they were designed around square geometrical framework. In order to feature a bending motion to the characters, a special animated muscular curve was made over fitted on their polygonal grid animated framework.

Around July 2015, Wizart Animation revealed the studios were working on a 52 x 12 minute, 3D animated series which is targeted for children aged 4–6 years. All the characters have their own distinct characteristics and do not resemble each other. The eponymous character Yoko who is characterized as a game-friendly forest dweller whose language consists of only one word, Yoko or Basque for "game." The character is also depicted as an invisible being to adults but visible to children.

Director Rishat Gilmetdinov says, "There will be an interactive part for each episode — a minute-long thematic game will be told, and there will be a cultural exchange: our games, Spanish games. And children, after watching this part, will be able to go to the Park and play with friends in these games. This is intended to break away from tablets and computers." Andy Yerkes was one of the creators of the series with previous credits including Pocoyo and Jungle Junction. Animation director and screenwriter Evgenia Golubeva wrote the first fifteen episodes for the series. Eva Ojanguren, Jaione Intxausti and Arantxa Moñux for the Basque version were in charge of giving voice to the protagonists of while, H.D. Quinn, a voice actor from the Pokémon series, voiced the character Yoko for all the versions of the film.

In the 2014 MIPCOM the new animated series Yoko was presented. The series received acclaim from buyers of Indonesia, Turkey and the Middle East. At the Asia TV Forum & Market in October 2015 held in Singapore, the series was presented to the potential buyers in Asia. At the Shanghai Film Market held in June 2015, Wizart presented the animated series. In 2015 Cannes at MIPJunior, the series was presented to one of the largest international exhibition of content for children and youth. A movie based on the TV series was launched in 2015 titled Yoko and His Friends (Yoko y Sus Amigos) that was released along with the TV broadcast. In Russia, the first season, consisting of 52 episodes, premiered on Russian national channels CTC and Carousel during late 2016. Additionally, in Spain the series broadcast on RTVE channel CLAN TV. On 14 May 2016, a special premiere of the TV series in the Russian theaters occurred that featured the Episode 23 (Small Safari), where the characters will go on a journey through the wildlife. The event was organized by the special cinema event known as CARTOON in the cinema.

Distributions 
Following a number of agreements, the series broadcast in Russian educational channel O! (Pay TV Worldwide), as well as on Mult, Tlum, Ani (Pay TV), VTV in Belarus and ETV in Estonia. In March 2017, Jetpack Distributions, a global distributor of entertainment distributed the series to Canada, Portugal, India and Sri Lanka. Canada's BBC Knowledge, Portugal's Canal Panda, India and Sri Lanka's Sun TV, and Nick Jr. in Italy agreed to broadcast the show. Promotional toy campaign was launched by Bauer, Russia's DUM and Alliance, as well as Spain's Bizak. A Master Toy agreement was signed featuring wooden toys, action figures of the four cartoon characters: Yoko, Mitya, Vic and Maya; and construction sets. In Spain, the TV series debuted in March 2017 in the Basque language on EITB.

In February 2018, Jetpack Distributor bought Netflix on a deal to broadcast the series for new countries in U.S. and United Kingdom. Dominic Gardiner, the CEO of Jetpack Distribution says, "Yoko has proved to have mass global appeal. It contains elements that pre-school kids really love, including magic and adventure. It also highlights the value of play and delivers positive messages." New countries to broadcast the series included China released by distributor Huashi TV on Tencent. Nat Geo Kids Latin America picked up the show for Latin American and the Caribbean countries.

Around July 2018, the animation studios revealed they would be presenting a second season for Yoko due for delivery in Autumn 2018. In Russia the second season debuted in October 2019 on the channel O! In April 2020, Wizart presented Maya Knows, an educational TV series spin-off of the project Yoko. In each episode, the heroine Maya, along with her magical friend Yoko, will explain to children an interesting fact about the world around them.

Currently Yoko airs in international channels across 60 countries. In Spain, the series broadcast in ETB 3. Since its premiere in 2016, Yoko has achieved an average share of 24% viewership in the target of 4-8 age group as indicated by RTVE in Spain.

Series Overview

Episodes

Season 1 (2016)

Season 2 (2019)

Special (2020)

Maya Knows 
The premiere of the first four episodes of educational series spin-off Maya Knows started on 30 April 2020 exclusively in the social network VK. Each episode is only two minutes in duration for a total of twenty four minutes that features a new outlook to the Yoko series through the singular character character Maya. In each episode, the characters encounter a new topic to explore. Maya tells her friends one informative and interesting fact about the world around her. From painting, French cuisine, to history of photography the series presents the details of Maya's knowledge of these themes along with different characters such as Yoko and a squirrel.

TV Channels and Online platforms

Festivals and Awards 

Kanal-o applauded the series' message by stating, "Yoko not only entertains, but also develops. All good children are a little restless and tomboyish. And, sometimes, the spirit of competition leads to quarrels. But Yoko also comes to the rescue. Unobtrusively, in the form of a game, it leads kids to the idea that friendship is more important than victory, and really fun happens only when everyone has fun. With Yoko, any game turns from entertainment to an instructive parable, living through which the characters of the series, and with them the small audience, become a little more adult. Perhaps that is why the cartoon is so popular not only for children, but also for parents."

On 22 March 2015 at Suzdalfest, Yoko was awarded the prize with the category, "Animated Series with the Greatest International Potential." The distinction was tabulated by Reed MIDEM, the organizing body behind content markets MIPTV, MIPCOM, MIPJunior and MIPFormats who previously gave Yoko the same award.

See also 

 Yoko and His Friends
 Children's television series
 Lists of animated television series

References

External links 
 
 
Yoko at RTVE, a TV Channel from Spain

2010s animated television series
Russian children's animated adventure television series
Russian children's animated comedy television series
Spanish children's animated adventure television series
Spanish children's animated comedy television series
RTVE shows
Children's animated adventure television series
Animated preschool education television series
2010s preschool education television series
2010s children's television series
2010s school television series
Animated television series about children
Spanish preschool education television series